DXMR may refer to:
 DXMR-AM, an AM radio station broadcasting in Zamboanga City, branded as Radyo Pilipinas.
 DXMR-FM, an FM radio station broadcasting in Cagayan de Oro, branded as Magnum Radio.